Marcus Hilpert (born 1 July 1971) is a former professional tennis player from Germany.

Early years
Hilpert was born in India, to a Khasi Indian mother and German father. His father worked as a diplomat, so Hilpert also lived in Indonesia, Sri Lanka and Sudan during his childhood. Despite his mother being an Indian national, Hilpert wasn't eligible to represent the country of his birth in Davis Cup tennis as he only held a German passport.

He later studied at the University of Arkansas and was an NCAA singles semi-finalist in 1994.

Tour career
Hilpert was a doubles quarter-finalist in the 1999 Majorca Open (with Vaughan Snyman) and at San Marino in 2000, partnering Jens Knippschild. His best singles performance was a second round appearance in 1997 at the Washington D.C. tournament, where he had a win over Reed Cordish.

The German won three ATP Challenger doubles titles in the late 1990s.

He now competes on the seniors circuit under the flag of the Netherlands.

Challenger titles

Doubles

References

External links
 
 

1971 births
Living people
German male tennis players
Indian people of German descent
Arkansas Razorbacks men's tennis players
German people of Indian descent
German emigrants to the Netherlands
Khasi people